Hanna Maria Katariina Sarkkinen (born 18 April 1988 in Oulunsalo) is a Finnish politician currently serving in the Parliament of Finland for the Left Alliance for the Oulu constituency. 

In June 2021, she was appointed Minister of Social Affairs and Health by President Sauli Niinistö. In the end of January 2022, she was able to announce several measures taken to tackle the Covid-19 pandemic in Finland will be lifted, following the example of Denmark. In June 2022, she traveled to Estonia to coordinate the accommodation and social security systems between the two countries for the Ukrainians fleeing the Russo-Ukrainian war. Despite her party being undecided whether to support or oppose a NATO membership would provide, Sarkkinen personally supported the membership bid.

References

1988 births
Living people
People from Oulu
Left Alliance (Finland) politicians
Members of the Parliament of Finland (2015–19)
Members of the Parliament of Finland (2019–23)
21st-century Finnish women politicians
Women members of the Parliament of Finland